Pitch Black Brigade is the second album by the Norwegian black metal band Vreid. The sound was mixed by Lars Klokkerhaug at Subsonic Society.

Track listing
"Då Draumen Rakna" ("When the Dream Shattered") – 5:16
"Left to Hate" – 4:38
"Pitch Black" – 4:20
"The Red Smell" – 4:42
"Hengebjørki" ("The Silver Birch") – 9:21
"Our Battle" – 3:35
"Hang 'Em All" – 3:33
"Eit Kapitell For Seg Sjølv"("A Story of its Own") – 6:54

References

Vreid albums
2006 albums